Korea University (고려대학교)  most commonly refers to a private university in South Korea.
 Korea University Anam Campus is the main campus in Seoul. The main portion of the campus is located in Anam-dong, Seoul
 Korea University Sejong Campus is a campus mainly in Sejong

Korea University (조선대학교)  may also refer to:

 Korea University (Japan), a private university-level miscellaneous school affiliated by pro-North Korea Chongryon and located in Kodaira, Tokyo